The Olympic flame is a symbol used in the Olympic movement. It is also a symbol of continuity between ancient and modern games. Several months before the Olympic Games, the Olympic flame is lit at Olympia, Greece. This ceremony starts the Olympic torch relay, which formally ends with the lighting of the Olympic cauldron during the opening ceremony of the Olympic Games. The flame then continues to burn in the cauldron for the duration of the Games, until it is extinguished during the Olympic closing ceremony.

Origins

The first time that a symbolic flame made its appearance in the Summer Olympic Games was for the 1928 Summer Olympics in Amsterdam. The main purpose of this fire, placed in a large bowl on top of a slender tower, named "the Marathon Tower", was to  indicate for miles around where in Amsterdam the Olympic Games were being held.  This tower was associated with the Marathon Race and all its elements, including the fire, were an idea of the architect Jan Wils who also had designed the stadium 

The idea for the Olympic flame was derived from ancient Greek ceremonies where a sacred fire was kept burning throughout the celebration of the ancient Olympics on the altar of the sanctuary of Hestia. In Ancient Greek mythology, fire had divine connotations and it was thought to have been stolen from the gods by Prometheus. Sacred fires were present at many ancient Greek sanctuaries, including those at Olympia. Every four years, when Zeus was honoured at the Olympic Games, additional fires were lit at his temple and that of his wife, Hera. The modern Olympic flame is ignited every two years in front of the ruins of the temple of Hera.

When the idea of a symbolic fire was introduced during the 1928 Summer Olympics, an employee of the Electric Utility of Amsterdam lit the first symbolic flame in the Marathon Tower of the Olympic Stadium in Amsterdam. The Olympic flame and the Olympic torch relay was first introduced to the Summer Olympics at the 1936 Summer Olympics in Berlin.

Main ceremonies

Olympic flame lighting
 
The Olympic fire is ignited several months before the opening ceremony of the Olympic Games at the site of the ancient Olympics in Olympia, Greece.

Eleven women representing the Vestal Virgins, perform a celebration at the Temple of Hera in which the first torch of the Olympic Torch Relay is kindled by the light of the Sun. Its rays are concentrated by a parabolic mirror. A female performer acting as a priestess presents the torch and an olive branch to the first relay bearer (who also is a Greek athlete) followed by a dove release to symbolize peace.

At the beginning of the ceremony, the Olympic anthem is sung first followed by the national anthem of the country hosting the Olympics and the national anthem of Greece along with the hoisting of the flags.

After the ceremony at Olympia the Olympic flame first travels around Greece, and is then transferred during a ceremony in the Panathenaic Stadium in Athens from the previous Olympic city to the current year's host city.

The Olympic torch relay, which transports the Olympic flame from Olympia, Greece to the various designated sites of the Games, had no ancient precedent and was introduced by Carl Diem at the 1936 Summer Olympics in Berlin, Germany.

At the first Olympic torch relay, the flame was transported from Olympia to Berlin over 3,187 kilometers (1,980 miles) by 3,331 runners in twelve days and eleven nights. There were minor protests in Yugoslavia and Czechoslovakia on the way, which were suppressed by the local security forces.

In the 1956 Melbourne Games in Australia, local veterinary student Barry Larkin protested against the relay when he tricked onlookers by carrying a fake flame, consisting of a pair of underpants set on fire in a plum pudding can, attached to a chair leg. He successfully managed to hand over the fake flame to the Mayor of Sydney, Pat Hills and escape without being noticed.

The Olympic torch travels routes that symbolise human achievement. Although most of the time the torch with the Olympic flame is still carried by runners, it has been transported in many different ways. The fire travelled by boat in 1948 and 2012 to cross the English Channel and was carried by rowers in Canberra as well as by dragon boat in Hong Kong in 2008.

It was first transported by airplane in 1952 when the flame travelled to Helsinki. In 1956, all carriers in the torch relay to Stockholm, where the equestrian events were held instead of in Melbourne, travelled on horseback.

Remarkable means of transportation were used in 1976, when the flame was transformed to a radio signal and transmitted from Europe to the New World: Heat sensors in Athens detected the flame, the signal was sent to Ottawa via satellite where it was received and used to trigger a laser beam to re-light the flame. The torch, but not the flame, was taken into space by astronauts in 1996, 2000 and 2013. Other unique means of transportation include a Native American canoe, a camel, and Concorde. The torch has been carried across water; the 1968 Grenoble Winter Games was carried across the port of Marseilles by a diver holding it aloft above the water. In 2000, an underwater flare was used by a diver across the Great Barrier Reef en route to the Sydney Games. In 2012 it was carried by boat across Bristol Harbour in the UK and on the front of a London Underground train to Wimbledon.

In 2004, the first global torch relay was undertaken, a journey that lasted 78 days. The Olympic flame covered a distance of more than 78,000 km in the hands of some 11,300 torchbearers, travelling to Africa and South America for the first time, visiting all previous Olympic cities, and finally returning to Athens for the 2004 Summer Olympics.

The 2008 Summer Olympics torch relay spanned all six inhabited continents before proceeding through China. However there was protests against China's human rights record in London where a "ring of steel" was formed around the flame to protect it, but one protester managed to grab hold of the torch while it was being held by television presenter Konnie Huq. In Paris the torch was extinguished at least twice by Chinese officials (five times according to French police) so that it could be transported in a bus amid protests while it was being paraded through Paris. This eventually led to the cancellation of the relay's last leg in the city. Demonstrations were also held in San Francisco and the route the torch would take was cut in half.

As a result in 2009, the International Olympic Committee announced that future torch relays could be held only within the country hosting the Olympics after the initial Greek leg was finished. Although this rule took effect with the 2014 Winter Olympics, the organizers of the 2010 Winter Olympics in Vancouver and the 2012 Summer Olympics in London chose to hold their torch relays only in their respective hosting countries of Canada and the United Kingdom (except for brief stops in the United States and Ireland, respectively).

The Olympic torch relay in the host country ends with the lighting of the Olympic cauldron during the opening ceremony in the central host stadium of the Games. The final carrier is often kept unannounced until the last moment. Over the years, it has become a tradition to let a famous athlete of the host nation, former athletes or athletes with significant achievements and milestones be the last runner in the Olympic torch relay.

Re-igniting the flame
It is not uncommon for the Olympic flame to be accidentally or deliberately extinguished during the course of the torch relay (and on at least one occasion the cauldron itself has gone out during the Games). To guard against this eventuality, multiple copies of the flame are transported with the relay or maintained in backup locations. When a torch goes out, it is re-lit (or another torch is lit) from one of the backup sources. Thus, the fires contained in the torches and Olympic cauldrons all trace a common lineage back to the same Olympia lighting ceremony.

 One of the more memorable extinguishings occurred at the 1976 Summer Olympics held in Montreal, Quebec, Canada. After a rainstorm doused the Olympic flame a few days after the games had opened, an official re-lit the flame using a cigarette lighter. Organizers quickly doused it again and re-lit it using a backup of the original flame.
 At the 2004 Summer Olympics, when the Olympic flame came to the Panathinaiko Stadium to start the global torch relay, the night was very windy and the torch, lit by Gianna Angelopoulos-Daskalaki of the Athens 2004 Organizing Committee, blew out due to the wind, but was re-lit from the backup flame taken from the original flame lit at Olympia. 
 In October 2014 in Russia, the Olympic flame was blown out at the Kremlin and was reignited from a security officer's lighter instead of the back up flame.

The current design of the torch has a safeguard built into it: There are two flames inside the torch. There is a highly visible (yellow flame) portion that burns cooler and is more prone to extinguish in wind and rain, but there is also a smaller hotter (blue in the candle's wick) flame akin to a pilot light hidden inside the torch which is protected from wind and rain and is capable of relighting the cooler, more visible portion if it is extinguished. The fuel contained inside the torch is able to keep it lit for approximately 15 minutes before it would be extinguished.

Selected relays in detail

The flame is transported from Greece to the host country where the flame is transported by torch around the host nation to the main stadium.

Olympic cauldron lighting

During the opening ceremony the final bearer of the torch runs towards the cauldron, often placed at the top of a grand staircase, and then uses the torch to start the flame in the stadium. The climactic transfer of the Olympic flame from the final torch to the cauldron at the central host stadium marks the symbolic commencement of the Games.

As with being the final runner of the Olympic torch relay, it is considered to be a great honor to light the Olympic cauldron, and in the same way it has become a tradition to select notable athletes to conduct this part of the ceremony. On other occasions, the people who lit the cauldron in the stadium are not famous but nevertheless symbolize Olympic ideals. Japanese runner Yoshinori Sakai was born on the day of the atomic bombing of Hiroshima. He was chosen for the role to symbolize Japan's postwar reconstruction and peace, opening the 1964 Tokyo Games. At the 1976 Games in Montreal, two teenagers — one from the French-speaking part of the country, one from the English-speaking part — symbolized the unity of Canada.

At the 2012 Games in London, the torch was carried by Sir Steve Redgrave to a group of seven young British athletes (Callum Airlie, Jordan Duckitt, Desiree Henry, Katie Kirk, Cameron MacRitchie, Aidan Reynolds and Adelle Tracey)  — each nominated by a British Olympic champion — who then each lit a single tiny flame on the ground, igniting 204 copper petals before they converged to form the cauldron for the Games.

 
The first well-known athlete to light the cauldron in the stadium was the ninefold Olympic Champion Paavo Nurmi, who excited the home crowd in Helsinki in 1952. In 1968, Enriqueta Basilio became the first woman to light the Olympic Cauldron at the Olympic Games in Mexico City.

Perhaps one of the most spectacular of Olympic cauldron lighting ceremonies took place at the 1992 Summer Olympics, when Paralympic archer Antonio Rebollo lit the cauldron by shooting a burning arrow over it, which ignited gas rising from the cauldron. Unofficial videos seem to indicate that the flame was lit from below. Twenty years after the Barcelona Games one of those involved said that the flame was "switched on" ("Se encendió con un botón", in Spanish). Two years later, the Olympic fire was brought into the stadium of Lillehammer by a ski jumper. In Beijing 2008, Li Ning "ran" on air around the interior edge of the Beijing National Stadium's roof, and lit a cauldron attached to it.

Olympic cauldron designs
The cauldron and the pedestal are always the subjects of unique and often dramatic design. These also tie in with how the cauldron is lit during the Opening Ceremony.
In Los Angeles in 1984, Rafer Johnson lit a wick at the top of the archway after having climbed a big flight of steps. The flame flared up a pipe, through the Olympic Rings, and on up the side of the tower to ignite the cauldron.
In Atlanta in 1996, the cauldron was an artistic scroll decorated in red and gold. It was lit by Muhammad Ali, using a mechanical, self-propelling fuse ball that transported the flame up a wire from the stadium to its cauldron. At the 1996 Summer Paralympics, the scroll was lit by paraplegic climber Mark Wellman, hoisting himself up a rope to the cauldron.
For the 2000 Summer Olympics in Sydney, Cathy Freeman walked across a circular pool of water and ignited the cauldron through the water, surrounding herself within a ring of fire. The planned spectacular climax to the ceremony was delayed by the technical glitch of a computer switch that malfunctioned, causing the sequence to shut down by giving a false reading. This meant that the Olympic flame was suspended in mid-air for about four minutes, rather than immediately rising up a water-covered ramp to the top of the stadium. When it was discovered what the problem was, the program was overridden and the cauldron continued up the ramp, where it finally rested on a tall silver pedestal.
For the 2002 Winter Olympics in Salt Lake City, Utah, United States, the cauldron was lit by the members of the winning 1980 US hockey team. After being skated around the centre ice rink there in the stadium, the flame was carried up a staircase to the team members, who then lit a wick of sorts at the bottom of the cauldron tower which set off a line of flames that travelled up inside the tower until it reached the cauldron at the top which ignited. This cauldron was the first to use glass and incorporated running water to prevent the glass from heating and to keep it clean.
For the 2004 Summer Olympics in Athens, the cauldron was in the shape of a giant olive leaf which bowed down to accept the flame from windsurfer Nikolaos Kaklamanakis.
In the 2006 Winter Olympics in Turin, Stefania Belmondo placed the flame on an arched lighting apparatus, which initiated a series of fireworks before lighting the top of the  Olympic cauldron, the highest in the history of the Winter Olympic Games.
In the 2008 Summer Olympics in Beijing, the cauldron resembled the end of a scroll that lifted out from the stadium rim and spiralled upwards. It was lit by Li Ning, who was raised to the rim of the stadium by wires. He ran around the rim of the stadium while suspended and as he ran, an unrolling scroll was projected showing film clips of the flame's journey around the world from Greece to Beijing. As he approached the cauldron, he lit an enormous wick, which then transferred the flame to the cauldron. The flame then spiralled up the structure of the cauldron before lighting it at the top.
In the 2010 Winter Olympics at Vancouver, a team of athletes (Catriona Le May Doan, Steve Nash, Nancy Greene and Wayne Gretzky) were to simultaneously light the base of poles, which would then carry the flames upwards to the cauldron. However, only three out of four poles came out of the ground due to mechanical problems, resulting in inadvertently excluding Le May Doan from lighting it with the other three athletes. Because the site of the ceremonies - BC Place - was a domed stadium, Gretzky was sent via the back of a pick-up truck to a secondary site — the Vancouver Convention Centre which served as the International Broadcast Centre for these Olympics — to light a larger cauldron of a similar design located outdoors, as Olympic rules state that the flame must be in public view for the entirety of the Olympics. In the closing ceremonies, Le May Doan took part in a joke about the mechanical glitch, and she was able to light the fully raised fourth pole and have the indoor cauldron relit.
At the 2012 Summer Olympics in London, the flame was passed to a group of seven young British athletes (Callum Airlie, Jordan Duckitt, Desiree Henry, Katie Kirk, Cameron MacRitchie, Aidan Reynolds, and Adelle Tracey) who then each lit a single tiny flame on the ground, igniting 204 petals (one for each delegation in the Games) that rose up to form a single cauldron. The cauldron that traditionally flames continuously from the opening until the closing ceremony was temporarily extinguished (the flame itself was transferred to a lantern) prior to the athletics events while the cauldron was moved to the southern side of the stadium. It was relit by Austin Playfoot, a torchbearer from the 1948 Olympics. In contrast to the cauldrons in Vancouver, the cauldron was not visible to the public outside the stadium. Instead, monitors had been placed throughout the Olympic Park showing the public live footage of the flame.
For the 2014 Winter Olympics in Sochi, Russia, the cauldron was situated directly outside Fisht Olympic Stadium, the ceremonial venue for the Games. After the torch's lap around the stadium, triple gold medalists Irina Rodnina and Vladislav Tretiak carried the torch outside the stadium to light a larger version of the "celebration cauldron" used in the main torch relay at the center of the Olympic Park. A line of gas jets carried the flame from the celebration cauldron up the main cauldron tower, eventually lighting it at the top.
For the 2016 Summer Olympics in Rio de Janeiro, Brazil, the cauldron was lit inside the Maracanã Stadium, the ceremonial venue for the Games, by Vanderlei de Lima. As part of these Games' appeal towards environmental protection, organizers deliberately chose to use a basic design with a smaller flame than past cauldrons. To compensate for the smaller cauldron, it is accompanied by a larger kinetic sculpture designed by Anthony Howe. The official  public cauldron was lit in the Candelária Plaza following the opening ceremony.
For the 2018 Winter Olympics in Pyeongchang, South Korea, the flame was eventually handed to Yuna Kim, who was at the top of a set of steps. She then lit a wick of sorts, which lit a large metal flaming pillar. The pillar rose to the top of the cauldron, lighting it. The cauldron was a large white sculpture with a large sphere on the top, acting for the cauldron. The cauldron's design was inspired by Joseon white porcelain.
For the 2020 Summer Olympics in Tokyo, Japan, the flame was handed to Naomi Osaka, who stood in front of a large mountain-like structure resembling Mount Fuji. At the top of the mountain was a large ball, resembling the sun. This ball unfolded into the petals of a flower representing hope and vitality, forming the cauldron. Osaka then walked up a set of steps revealed as the ball unfolded and lit the cauldron. 
The 2022 Winter Olympics in Beijing eschewed a cauldron entirely, with the final two torchbearers— the skiers Zhao Jiawen and Dinigeer Yilamujiang—fited the last used torch into a small strucure at the centre of a large snowflake, constructed from crystalline placards with the names of each competing National Olympic Committee.Three official cauldrons where lited after at the three competions venues clusters. 

After being lit the flame in the Olympic cauldron continues to burn during the Games, until the closing ceremony, when it is finally put out symbolizing the official end of the Games.

Coinage
The Olympic flame has been used as a symbol and a main motif numerous times in different commemorative coins. A recent example was the 50th anniversary of the Helsinki Olympic Games commemorative coin, minted in 2002. In the obverse, the Olympic flame above the Earth can be seen. Finland is the only country highlighted; it was the host of the 1952 games.

See also
 Eternal flame
 Paralympic Flame
 Flame of Hope (Special Olympics)
 Asian Games Torch, a torch relay associated with the Asian Games
 Pan American Torch, a torch relay associated with the Pan American Games
 King's Baton Relay, an analogous relay associated with the Commonwealth Games
 Universiade Torch, a torch relay associated with the Universiade

Notes

References
Volker Kluge. 1997–2004. Olympische Sommerspiele – Die Chronik. Five volumes. Sportverlag except Vol. 5 (Südwest-Verlag). ; ; ; ; .

External links

 
 
 
 Official site of the Olympic Movement - Images and information on every game since 1896
 IOC brochure on the history of Olympic flame (1 MB PDF)
 TorchRelay.net - Torch Relay coverage. Includes torchbearer profiles, photos, videos, and more.
 Athens Info Guide - A list of past torches
 Sondre Norheim - on the three occasions when the Olympic flame was lit in Morgedal
 BBC article on the history of the torch
 The Nazi Olympics: Berlin 1936 - online exhibition

 
flame
Ceremonial flames
Flame
Symbols introduced in 1928
Dutch inventions